The athletics competition in the 1966 Central American and Caribbean Games were held in San Juan, Puerto Rico.

Medal summary

Men's events

Women's events

Medal table

References

 
 
 

Athletics at the Central American and Caribbean Games
C
1966 Central American and Caribbean Games
International athletics competitions hosted by Puerto Rico
Athl
Athl
Athl